Guido Marussig (1885–1972) was an Italian painter.

Biography
He was born in Trieste. After his initial training at the Scuola Industriale Triestina, Guido Marussig moved to Venice to attend the Academy of Fine Arts  thanks to a scholarship from Trieste City Council. In 1905 he participated in the Esposizione Internazionale d’Arte di Venezia, and was to continue to do so in the following years. He was a Symbolist painter influenced by the work of the Vienna Secession, and particularly the art of Gustav Klimt, and he also experimented with engraving techniques. He contributed illustrations to the magazine L’Eroica and from 1918 to 1937 he taught at the Scuola del Libro in Milan, where he had moved in 1916.

In 1921 he participated in designing and decorating Gabriele D’Annunzio’s  Vittoriale; he had already designed the sets for his tragedy La nave. Towards the end of the decade he became a member of the Novecento Italiano group, whose poetics also influenced later works such as the mosaic Justice Entering the Courtroom (1939) in the Palazzo di Giustizia in Milan. During subsequent decades his paintings acquired an ever greater degree of geometric abstraction, while he continued to work as a set designer and to contribute to various art periodicals. He designed  the sets for the first opera production at the Teatro alla Scala in Milan following its reconstruction after bombing during the Second World War. Verdi's Nabucco opened on 26 December 1946.

Guido Marussig died in Gorizia in 1972.

References

 Laura Casone, Guido Marussig, online catalogue Artgate by Fondazione Cariplo, 2010, CC BY-SA (source for the first revision of this article).

Other projects

Italian male painters
20th-century Italian painters
Symbolist painters
Artists from Trieste
1885 births
1972 deaths
20th-century Italian male artists
Austro-Hungarian emigrants to Italy